American Samoa will compete at the 2022 World Athletics Championships in Eugene, United States, from 15 to 24 July 2022.

Results
American Samoa has entered 1 athlete.

Men 
Track and road events

References

World Championships in Athletics
2022
Nations at the 2022 World Athletics Championships